"Till We Ain't Strangers Anymore" is a song by American rock band Bon Jovi, from their tenth studio album, Lost Highway, released in 2007. The song was released by Mercury Nashville to radio in the United States, and as a CD Maxi in Germany, Switzerland and Austria in November 2007 as the album's third single. It features country pop singer LeAnn Rimes, and also appears as a bonus track on her 12th album, Family.

Song background 
It was written by Bon Jovi band members Jon Bon Jovi and Richie Sambora with country singer-songwriter Brett James, and produced by Dann Huff. The song was the second cross-over song with a female country singer by Bon Jovi, after "Who Says You Can't Go Home" with Jennifer Nettles of the duo Sugarland. Bon Jovi played the whole of the Lost Highway album live and released the concert as a DVD, although "Till We Ain't Strangers Anymore" was performed without Rimes.

Awards and nominations 
The song won the CMT Music Award for the Collaborative Video of the Year in 2008. Rimes accepted the award, as Bon Jovi was not at the awards ceremony. Bon Jovi's previous country duet, "Who Says You Can't Go Home", claimed the same award in 2006.

Music video
The music video for "Till We Ain't Strangers Anymore" features Jon Bon Jovi and LeAnn Rimes walking around the streets of New York City at night. A bed scene was set up in front of the Flatiron Building. The song was also nominated for the Academy of Country Music Award for Vocal Event of the Year.

Track listings 
 CD single (Catalogue number: 0602517555112)
 "Till We Ain't Strangers Anymore" - 4:43
 "Who Says You Can't Go Home" (Stripped) - 4:49

 CD-Maxi (Catalogue number: 0602517555105)
 "Till We Ain't Strangers Anymore" (Album version) - 4:43
 "Lost Highway" (Stripped) - 4:08
 "Who Says You Can't Go Home" (Stripped) - 4:45
 "(You Want To) Make a Memory" (Live video from the Lost Highway Concert DVD)

Charts

References 

2007 songs
2007 singles
Bon Jovi songs
LeAnn Rimes songs
Male–female vocal duets
Songs written by Brett James
Songs written by Richie Sambora
Songs written by Jon Bon Jovi
Song recordings produced by Dann Huff
Island Records singles